Huancavelica District is one of nineteen districts of the province Huancavelica in Peru.

Geography 
The Chunta mountain range traverses the district. Some of the highest mountains of the district are listed below:

See also 
 Administrative divisions of Peru
 Kachimayu
 Qiwllaqucha

References